Carpignano Sesia is a comune (municipality) in the Province of Novara in the Italian region Piedmont, located about  northeast of Turin and about  northwest of Novara.

Carpignano Sesia borders the following municipalities: Briona, Fara Novarese, Ghemme, Ghislarengo, Lenta, Sillavengo, and Sizzano.

Main sights
"Castle" (Ricetto), a group of walls with fortified houses in the historic center, built in the 11th centuries by the Counts of Pombia
Church of San Pietro, located in the ricetto, known from as early as the 11th century. It houses some Gothic-style frescoes (1st century)

Twin towns — sister cities
Carpignano Sesia is twinned with:

  Mathay, France

References

 
Cities and towns in Piedmont